Valentin Khristoforovich Kolumb (Mari and Russian: Валентин Христофорович Колумб, 3 May 1935, Mizener - 8 December 1974) was a Mari poet.

He was also a translator, translating works of Johann Wolfgang von Goethe, William Shakespeare, Sándor Petőfi, Nikolay Nekrasov, Alexander Blok, Sergei Yesenin, Aleksandr Tvardovsky and others into Mari.

Sources
  80th birth anniversary article

1935 births
1974 deaths
People from Morkinsky District
Mari people
Translators of Johann Wolfgang von Goethe
Translators of William Shakespeare
Maxim Gorky Literature Institute alumni